The term Proto-Malay, which translates to Melayu Asli (aboriginal Malay) or Melayu Purba (ancient Malay) or Melayu Tua (old Malay), refers to Austronesian speakers, possibly from mainland Asia, who moved to the Malay peninsula and Malay archipelago in a long series of migrations between 2500 and 1500 BC, and in one model the first of two migrations of early Malay speakers, before that of the Deutero-Malays. The Proto-Malays are the ancestors of the Malays in the modern Malaysia and Indonesia.

The Proto-Malays are believed to be seafarers knowledgeable in oceanography and possessing advanced fishing as well as basic agricultural skills. Over the years, they settled in various places and adopted various customs and religions as a result of acculturation and inter-marriage with most of the people they come in contact with Orang Asli tribes such as the Semang and Senoi peoples.

Origin
The Encyclopedia of Malaysia: Early History has pointed out three theories of the origin of the Proto-Malay:

 The Yunnan theory, Mekong river migration (first published in 1889). The theory of Proto-Malay originating from Yunnan is supported by R.H Geldern, J.H.C Kern, J.R Foster, J.R Logen, Slametmuljana and Asmah Haji Omar. Other evidence that supports this theory includes: stone tools found at Malay Archipelago which are analogous to Central Asian tools; similarity of Malay customs and Assam customs; and the fact that the Malay and Cambodian languages are kindred languages because the ancestral home of Cambodians originated at the source of Mekong River.
 The seafarers theory (first published in 1965).
 The Taiwan theory (first published in 1997). For more information, see Austronesian languages.

Some historical linguists have concluded that there is scant linguistic basis for a Proto-/Deutero-Malay split. The findings suggests that the Proto-Malay and the Deutero-Malay peoples possibly belong to the same stock and origin. Previous theories suggested that the Deutero-Malays came in a second wave of migration, around 300 BCE, compared to the arrival of the Proto-Malays who came much earlier.

Geographical regions

Indonesia
Ernest-Théodore Hamy (1896) first identified 3 Proto-Malay groups that are found in Sumatra and Borneo, Indonesia:
 Batak people
 Dayak people
 Nias people

Both Koentjaraningrat and Alfred Russel Wallace's (1869) research also concluded that most of the Moluccans come under the Proto-Malay classification with a admixture with Melanesian. However, António Mendes Correia's findings re-classified the Timorese in Alfred Russel Wallace's ethnological chart as predominantly Proto-Malay. This is evidenced by the striking similarity in the architectural designs of traditional houses in Lospalos, East Timor with the Batak and Toraja people. In Sulawesi, not only are the Toraja people are regarded as part of the ancient Proto-Malay, but their neighboring Minahasan people as well who have migrated to the island in the megalithic period. In Sumatra, a little known pygmy tribe called the Mante people of Aceh are regarded as Proto-Malay and have thought to be extinct.

Other ethnic groups that are closely related to the Proto-Malay are such as the Nage people from Flores, which are considered a mixture of Proto-Malay and Melanesian and the Sakai people from Riau, which were originally pure Proto-Malay until later they were forced into the interior by the Deutero-Malays which led to their mixing with the Negritos. Off the west coast of Bengkulu, Sumatra Island, the indigenous people of Enggano Island known as the Enggano people are considered largely Proto-Malays.

Malaysia 

In Malaysia, the Proto-Malay are classified under the native Orang Asli group of people in the Peninsular Malaysia. They are officially known as:
 Jakun people
 Orang Kanaq
 Orang Kuala
 Orang Laut
 Orang Seletar
 Semelai people
 Temoq people
 Temuan people

Other ethnic groups outside of the Peninsular Malaysia that are also regarded as Proto-Malay apart from the Orang Asli people group are such as the Rungus people.

The Philippines

In the Philippines, there are several people groups that have been identified as part of the Proto-Malay group:
 Mangyan people
 Mangguangan people

While there are other ethnic groups in the Philippines, that are in some ways related or shares a mixture of Proto-Malay, namely:
 Teduray people, mainly a mixture of Proto-Malay and Native Indonesians
 Apayao people, a mixture of Proto-Malay and Negrito
 Zambale people, mainly Negrito with a mixture of Proto-Malay and Australoid
 Albay Bikol people, mainly Proto-Malay with some mixture of Negrito
 Batak people (Philippines), a mixture of Proto-Malay and Native Indonesians
 Bataan people, mainly Negrito with a mixture of Proto-Malay and Australoid
 Bagobo people, a mixture of Proto-Malay and Native Indonesians
 Blaan people, a mixture of Proto-Malay and Native Indonesians
 Manobo people, a mixture of Proto-Malay and Native Indonesians
 Subanon people, mainly Proto-Malay with a mixture of either Malay people (coastal) or Native Indonesians (interior)
 Ifugao people, a mixture of Proto-Malay and Malay people
 Tinggian people, a mixture of Native Indonesians and Malay people
 Bontoc people, mainly Malay people

See also
 Prehistoric Malaysia
 Melayu Kingdom, a Melayu Kuno kingdom

References

Prehistoric Asia
Anthropology
Orang Asli
Malay people